Kelvinbridge Parish Church, also known as the Kelvin Stevenson Memorial Church, is a Church of Scotland parish church, serving part of the North Kelvinside area of Glasgow, Scotland. The church is within the Church of Scotland's Presbytery of Glasgow.

Building
This distinctive church was designed by the architect J. J. Stevenson and built 1898–1902. Red sandstone is used, as in many buildings in Glasgow. It was built by the Free Church of Scotland as the Nathanial Stevenson Memorial Free Church, becoming part of the United Free Church of Scotland in 1900, which in turn united with the Church of Scotland in 1929.

The church has a "crown tower", similar to the Chapel of King's College, Aberdeen and St. Giles Cathedral in Edinburgh. The church is located adjacent to the River Kelvin in Belmont Street at Belmont Bridge.

History
The current congregation has been created by a union of several churches in the area, including the former East Park Church, Kelvinside Old Church and Wilton Church. In 2014 Kelvin Stevenson united with Lansdowne Parish Church to form the new Kelvinbridge Parish Church.

Ministry
The current minister (since 2003) is the Reverend Gordon Kirkwood.

See also
List of Church of Scotland parishes

References

External links
Image on the SCRAN website
http://www.ksmchurch.wordpress.com

Kelvin
Category A listed buildings in Glasgow
Listed churches in Glasgow
1898 establishments in Scotland
Churches completed in 1902
20th-century churches in the United Kingdom